Clube Desportivo Arrifanense is a Portuguese football club from Arrifana, Santa Maria da Feira. Founded in 1931, the club currently plays at the Estádio Maria Carolina Leite Resende Garcia which holds a capacity of 4,000. The club is currently sponsored by Lacatoni and Ramitex.

Honours
AF Aveiro First Division
 Winners (1): 1974–75

References

External links
 Profile at ZeroZero
 Profile at ForaDeJogo

Football clubs in Portugal
Association football clubs established in 1931
1931 establishments in Portugal
Sport in Santa Maria da Feira